Mauna Ulu is a volcanic cone in the eastern rift zone of the Kīlauea volcano on the island of Hawaii. It falls within the bounds of Hawaiʻi Volcanoes National Park. Mauna Ulu was in a state of eruption from May 1969 to July 1974.

Etymology 
The name, Mauna Ulu, means "the growing mountain".

1969–1974 eruption 

The eruption that formed Mauna Ulu began on May 24, 1969 and continued until July 22, 1974. At the time, this was the longest-lasting and most voluminous eruption on Kīlauea's flank in at least 2,200 years, lasting 1,774 days and producing 350 million cubic meters of lava. Lava flowed down the sides of the feature and large lava fountains (Including one 539.5 meter high fountain) were witnessed. The flows formed during this time period cover 44 sq. km and some lava deposits are reported to be 7.6 meters deep. The flows destroyed parts of the Chain of Craters Road, but the damage has since been repaired and the dormant cone can be now be visited.

References 



Kīlauea